Vincent Duport (born 15 December 1987) is a French professional rugby league footballer who plays for the Catalans Dragons in the Super League. He was previously playing for Toulouse Olympique in the Co-operative Championship. Primarily a centre but also used to playing in the back row and wing. In his early career, he was highly regarded in France as a talented, if physically fragile, youngster.

Background
Duport was born in Toulouse, Midi-Pyrénées, France.

Career
He was named in the France training squad for the 2008 Rugby League World Cup.

Duport returned to the Catalans Dragons for the remainder of the 2010 season after being granted a release from Toulouse.

On 22 October 2016, Duport returned to international rugby league for the first time since the 2013 Rugby League World Cup. Duport was part of the French team that took on England in an end of year test match in Avignon.

References

External links
Catalans Dragons profile
Toulouse Olympique profile
SL profile

1987 births
Living people
Catalans Dragons players
French rugby league players
France national rugby league team players
Rugby league centres
Lézignan Sangliers players
Toulouse Olympique players